Palmencrona was a Swedish noble family from Gothenburg, Sweden. Captain Lars Palmencrona (1670-1724), his wife Ingrid Palmencrona (née Bagge) (1660-1721) as well as her issue were ennobled (No. 1559) in 1718 by King Charles XII.

References

Swedish noble families